The 2004 Indo-Pak series was the 7th series of bilateral field hockey matches between Pakistan and India. The series was played over eight matches on home and away basis.

Each side hosted four matches from 24 September 2004 to 10 October 2004. Pakistan won the series 4–2. This was the first time both sides were coached by foreign coaches in a bilateral series with Gerhard Roch of Germany coaching India and Roelant Oltmans of Netherlands coaching for Pakistan. During the match in Amritsar of the series Pakistan's Sohail Abbas broke the record for most goals in international men's hockey scoring his 268th goal surpassing Paul Litjens of Netherlands who held the record for 22 years.

Background 
Prior to the start of the series Pakistan and India had faced each other 6 times since January 2004. They first met at the 2004 Azlan Shah Cup in Kuala Lumpur with Pakistan winning 3–2. They met twice in the 2004 Olympic Qualifiers in Madrid with Pakistan winning both matches. In June Pakistan again defeated India twice this time by a huge margin of 6–1 at the Hockey RaboTrophy in Amsterdam. Both teams had a disappointing campaign at the Olympics in Athens Pakistan defeated India in the crossover rounds to finish 5th while India finished 7th.

Sohail Abbas scored 12 goals against India in these matches including two hat-tricks. This series was also in the lead up to the 2004 Champions Trophy to be held in Lahore from December.

Venues

Squads 
India announced an 18-member squad on 20 September 2004. The Indian selection ignored veterans like Dhanraj Pillay, Baljit Singh Dhillon, Deepak Thakur and Gagan Ajit Singh, who all were part of the team at the Athens Olympics after the players made themselves unavailable for selection for different reasons. Pakistan announced its squad on 20 September as well. Waseem Ahmed was made captain after former captain Muhammad Nadeem announced his retirement from international hockey after the last month's Olympics.

Results 

 Pakistan won the series 4-2

Matches

First Leg 
Match 1

Match 2
Match 3

Match 4

Second Leg 
Match 1

Match 2

Match 3

Match 4

Statistics

Goalscorers 
There were 32 goals scored in 8 matches for an average of 4 goals per match

References 

Field hockey competitions in India
Field hockey competitions in Pakistan